Money Back Guarantee is a 2014 Indian Hindi language comedy film, directed by Sunil Pal and produced by his wife Sarita Pal. This film is the second directorial venture of stand-up comedian Sunil Pal under his production house, Pal Films.

Plot summary

The film tells the story of a common man, who falls prey to a greedy guru. It revolves around how fake advice is given by spiritual gurus to their followers and how a duped follower takes revenge in his own way. The protagonist of the film is a little boy who aspires to be a superstar but whose teacher steals all of his money as a domestic loan and never pays it back.

Cast 
 Sunil Pal
 Raju Shrivastav
 Mukesh Khanna
 Ganesh Acharya
 Ahsaan Qureshi
 Khayaali
 Bharti Singh
 Dhananjay Galani

References 

2010s Hindi-language films
2014 films